Angela Kais  (born 17 September 1980) is a Malaysian former footballer who plays as a forward. She is a former member of the Malaysia women's national football team, and has hold the captaincy of the team. She was part of the team at the 2016 AFF Women's Championship. At club level she played for PDRM FA in Malaysia.

Apart from football, she also has represented Malaysia women's national field hockey team in international tournaments.

International goals

References

1980 births
Living people
Malaysian women's footballers
Malaysia women's international footballers
Women's association football forwards
Competitors at the 2017 Southeast Asian Games
Southeast Asian Games competitors for Malaysia